Epizygaenella is a genus of moths belonging to the family Zygaenidae.

The species of this genus are found in Central Asia.

Species
Species:
 Epizygaenella caschmirensis

References

Zygaenidae
Zygaenidae genera